The Career of Nicodemus Dyzma (Polish title:  Kariera Nikodema Dyzmy) is a 1932 Polish bestselling political novel by Tadeusz Dołęga-Mostowicz. It was his first major literary success, with immediate material rewards, prompting Mostowicz to write and publish roughly two books per year (in total, he wrote 17 novels). The book, very popular already in the interwar period, was made into a 1956 Polish film with Adolf Dymsza in the title role, then into a 1980 television miniseries starring Roman Wilhelmi, and into a 2002 comedy film starring Cezary Pazura.

Plot

Nicodemus Dyzma is a small-town man who comes to the Polish capital from the Eastern provinces (known as "Kresy") in search of work. While walking the streets of Warsaw, he finds a lost invitation to a party reception. Hoping for a free meal, he decides to use it because he owns a tuxedo. At the reception, he befriends a member of parliament and wins the hearts of guests with his attitude. He is introduced to a wealthy landowner by the name of Kunicki, a former con artist, who is so impressed by Dyzma that he offers him a job as superintendent of his country estate.

At the estate, Dyzma meets Kunicki's wife, Nina, who quickly falls in love with him, but earns the distaste of Kunicki's daughter, Kasia, a lesbian who had been carrying on an affair with Nina. Soon Dyzma takes control of all affairs of the estate and starts to climb the social and political ladder. He is offered a series of prestigious appointments; however, he is forced to hide his past from the prying eyes of his adversaries and the general public. His lack of knowledge about things that are expected of him are taken either as his humour or eccentricities, or by his underlings as attempts to test them. Dyzma's rise in status is not good for his morals, as eventually he commissions the murder of his former boss from the provinces who might have revealed the truth of Dyzma's background. Ultimately he marries Nina and decides to refuse a commendation to become prime minister for fear that his pretenses will be revealed.

Background
Dołęga-Mostowicz was a journalist critical of the Polish interbellum political movement, Sanation, and its founder, Józef Piłsudski. Dołęga-Mostowicz was abducted by a group of soldiers in mufti, beaten up, and dumped outside Warsaw. He wrote the novel as a critique of the political class then in power.

Legacy

Nicodemus Dyzma has become proverbial in Poland as an archetype of the crude opportunist who makes his upwardly-mobile way by dint of fortuitous connections, ruthlessness and the acquiescence of an oblivious society.

He is forced by the spirit of his times and the society around him to become something they need him to become. Ignorant and malleable, Dyzma becomes a puppet in the hands of the elite class. Whatever happens to him during his climb of the social ladder falls outside of his mental, financial and legal competence.

Janusz Korwin-Mikke compared the eponymous Nikodem Dyzma favourably to the former President of Poland Lech Wałęsa. In Korwin-Mikke's opinion, there were three major differences between their characters: Dyzma eventually declined to become prime minister, while Wałęsa went on to become president; despite circumstances helping him, it was Dyzma who tricked others, whereas Wałęsa had everything arranged for him by the security services – an exaggeration of allegations of Wałęsa's previous collaboration with the SB; third, Dyzma could play the balalaika, while Wałęsa could not. This was incorrect, as in fact Dyzma played the mandolin.

The novel's title has served as the title of a song by Jacek Kaczmarski, presenting the viewpoint of Dyzma's eventual brother-in-law, Żorż Ponimirski, who eventually reveals the truth about Dyzma's past but is not believed.

Controversy
An American novel, Being There (1971), by fellow Polish native Jerzy Kosiński, has been said to bear a strong resemblance to the exploits of Nicodemus Dyzma. In June 1982, a Village Voice article by Geoffrey Stokes and Eliot Fremont-Smith accused Kosiński of plagiarizing Dołęga-Mostowicz, whose best-selling novel was largely unknown to English-readers at the time of Kosiński's 1970 publication.  (The article further claimed that all of Kosiński's novels, including Being There, had been ghost-written or possibly translated from Polish by his "assistant editors," pointing to striking stylistic differences among them and sparking further authorship controversies about Kosiński's literary output.)

Translation
Ewa Malachowska-Pasek and Megan Thomas translated the novel into English in 2018, and the English-language edition was published in September 2020 by Northwestern University Press. The translation won the Found in Translation Award for 2021.

See also

List of Poles
 Politics in fiction
 Political fiction
 Jerzy Kosiński and the claims of plagiarism including film Being There.

Notes

Further reading
 Read the full text of Kariera Nikodema Dyzmy in Polish

1932 novels
1956 films
20th-century Polish novels
Novels set in Warsaw
Polish comedy-drama television series
Polish novels
Polish novels adapted into films
Polish novels adapted into television shows
Polish satire